Roger Denis Parent (July 21, 1953 – November 29, 2016) was a Canadian politician, who was elected to the Legislative Assembly of Saskatchewan in the 2011 election. He represented the electoral district of Saskatoon Meewasin as a member of the Saskatchewan Party caucus. Parent died of cancer at age 63, just hours after his diagnosis was made public on November 29, 2016 and within two weeks of being diagnosed.

References

1953 births
2016 deaths
Deaths from cancer in Saskatchewan
Fransaskois people
Politicians from Prince Albert, Saskatchewan
Politicians from Saskatoon
Saskatchewan Party MLAs
21st-century Canadian politicians